Goldie is a 1931 American pre-Code black-and-white romantic comedy film starring Warren Hymer, Spencer Tracy and Jean Harlow. The script was written by Paul Perez and Gene Towne, and directed by Benjamin Stoloff. It was made before the Hays Code was rigidly enforced. It is a remake of Howard Hawks' 1928 silent film, A Girl in Every Port.

Plot
In every port, sailor Bill (Spencer Tracy) meets girls who sailor Spike (Warren Hymer) has already met and talked into getting his signature tattoo. When Bill and Spike finally meet, they become friends. Then, they meet Carny high diver Goldie (Jean Harlow).

Cast

Warren Hymer as Spike
Spencer Tracy as Bill
Jean Harlow as Goldie
George Raft as a pickpocket (uncredited)

References

External links
 
 
 

1931 films
1931 romantic comedy films
American black-and-white films
Remakes of American films
American romantic comedy films
Films directed by Benjamin Stoloff
Fox Film films
Seafaring films
Sound film remakes of silent films
1930s English-language films
1930s American films
Silent romantic comedy films